Charity Daw is a Cuban-American Singer and Songwriter based in Los Angeles, CA. She has written RIAA certified songs for Disney's chart-topping Descendants Franchise that includes a No. 1 on Billboard 200, as well as Dove Cameron, Jordin Sparks, Ally Brooke (Fifth Harmony), LOL Surprise, Mattel's American Girl, Jordan Fisher , Bella Thorne, We The Kings, Porsha Williams & Melissa Gorga of The Real Housewives franchise, and Andrew Dice Clay's Showtime Series DICE.

Songs she has written have been performed on The Grand Ole Opry, Dancing with the Stars, Dancing with the Stars: Juniors, Good Morning America, The Today Show and The Radio Disney Music Awards

As a performer she has appeared on Jimmy Kimmel Live!, The Today Show, NBC's Christmas in Rockefeller Center, Good Day L.A., and Hallmark's Home and Family.  Charity also contributed the song 'La Rubia' to the Ubisoft video game, Far Cry 6 Soundtrack.

Early life 
Charity studied fine art and music at Miami, Florida's schools for the arts; the Design and Architecture High School (DASH) and New World School of the Arts. As a student, the release of her first self-produced album led to a spot on American Idol (Season 7) followed by a stint in Nashville, TN where she developed her songwriting and performing skills on Music Row.

Tours 

 Band of Merrymakers – 2016, 2017, 2018

Songwriting credits

In films

In television

Recorded by artists

Featured artist credits

References

External links
 
 

American singer-songwriters
Year of birth missing (living people)
Living people
Musicians from Miami
American musicians of Cuban descent
American women singer-songwriters
American women record producers